Frederick John Fulton, KC (December 8, 1862 – July 25, 1936) was a  British-born and educated Canadian lawyer and politician.  He practiced law in Kamloops, British Columbia.  He was a member of the British Columbia Legislative Assembly from 1900 to 1909 serving a series of cabinet roles as President of the Executive Council, Minister of Education, Provincial Secretary, Attorney General and Chief Commissioner of Lands and Works.  As Attorney General, he prosecuted and convicted the notorious Bill Miner.

He was elected to the House of Commons of Canada under the banner of Prime Minister Borden's Unionist party in the 1917 general election and served as a Member of Parliament until 1920.

In 1906, he married Winnifred M. Davie, daughter of Hon. A.E.B. Davie. Frederick and Winifred had four sons. Their youngest son Davie Fulton, was also a Kamloops lawyer, provincial and federal politician and judge.

External links
 

1862 births
1936 deaths
British Columbia Conservative Party MLAs
Members of the House of Commons of Canada from British Columbia
Lawyers in British Columbia
Attorneys General of British Columbia
British emigrants to Canada